Rodez Aveyron Football Section Féminine (commonly known as Rodez) is a French football club based in Rodez which plays in D1 Féminine. The women's department of the men's football club was founded in 1993 and are known as the Rafettes.

Rodez plays its home matches at the Stadium Paul-Lignon in Rodez which has a capacity of 5,548 spectators. They are coached by Sébastien Joseph.

Players

Current squad

Updated 18 July 2022 Sources: Official website, footofeminin.fr, soccerway.com''

References

External links
  

 
Women's football clubs in France
Association football clubs established in 1993
1993 establishments in France
Division 1 Féminine clubs
Football clubs in Occitania (administrative region)
Sport in Aveyron